Tigaye Masrabaye (born 5 May 1990) is a Chadian former professional footballer who played as a midfielder. He made two appearances for the Chad national team.

References

External links
 

1990 births
Living people
Chadian footballers
Association football midfielders
Chad international footballers
Place of birth missing (living people)